The Al-Zein-Family (also known as the Al-Zein-clan) is an Arab-Lebanese  mafia-family based in Europe. They have 3000 members in Germany.

Members of the family in Germany and Sweden are known for their involvement in criminal activities. While most are based in Germany, the clan has members throughout Europe and the Middle East, for example in Sweden, Denmark, the Netherlands and Turkey.

References

Organised crime groups in Germany
Organized crime groups in Sweden
Mhallami gangs
Middle Eastern gangs